1 Chor 2 Mastikhor, is a 2017 Indian-Costa Rican comedy-drama film directed by Prabhakar Sharan and produced under the banner of Pacific Investment Corporation. 
The film stars Nancy Dobles, Prabhakar Sharan, Mario Chacón, José Castro and Scott Steiner. The movie was released on 15 December 2017.

The film was filmed in Costa Rica and released in Spanish as Enredados: La Confusión.

Plot
Leo, played by Sharan, is in a deep dilemma to choose between love and money. The movie focuses on a robbery takes a U-turn after an accident after which Leo chooses love over money.

Cast
 Prabhakar Sharan as Leo
 Nancy Doubles as Ana
 Mario Chacón as Chino
 José Castro as Mario
 Scott Steiner as Boss

References

External links
 

2010s Hindi-language films
Indian comedy-drama films
2017 comedy-drama films
2017 multilingual films
Indian multilingual films